Amsacta paolii is a moth of the family Erebidae. It was described by Emilio Berio in 1936 and is found in Somalia.

References

Endemic fauna of Somalia
Moths described in 1936
Spilosomina
Fauna of Somalia
Moths of Africa